Sztumska Wieś  (German Stuhmsdorf) is a village in the administrative district of Gmina Sztum, within Sztum County, Pomeranian Voivodeship, in northern Poland.

The Treaty of Stuhmsdorf between the Polish–Lithuanian Commonwealth and Sweden was signed in the village in 1635.

The village has a population of 500.

References

Villages in Sztum County